Final Portrait is a 2017 drama film written and directed by Stanley Tucci. The film stars Geoffrey Rush, Armie Hammer, Clémence Poésy, Tony Shalhoub, James Faulkner, and Sylvie Testud. The film had its world premiere at the Berlin International Film Festival on February 11, 2017. It was released in the United Kingdom on August 18, 2017, by Vertigo Releasing. On March 23, 2018, Sony Pictures Classics released the film in the United States.

Plot
In Paris 1964, famed sculptor Alberto Giacometti bumps into his old friend James Lord, an American critic, and asks him to be a model for his latest portrait in his studio for a couple of days. Flattered by the request, Lord complies and is told that only two days are needed to do the portrait. Giacometti lives with his wife Annette and also with his brother Diego at his studio which he also uses as a home. Giacometti also has a favorite muse whom he uses as a model and part time concubine who is the source of some tension in his home.

When the two days pass, Giacometti requests that the sittings with Lord continue for another week. Lord is busy and needs to return to his work back home, though the chance to have his portrait done by Giacometti entices him to stay. He delays his departure accordingly and puts off his writing assignments. Giacometti's progress on the portrait appears to move in starts and stops. Often he is in the habit of simply blanking out the face to start over again. Lord keeps making photos of the progress, but the progress often is stifled when Giacometti completely rethinks his approach and restarts the portrait from scratch.

Giacometti's relationship with his wife oscillates between genuinely caring for her while requiring that he also have the freedoms implied by having an open marriage. Annette is clearly disturbed by these vacillations in his affections and considers him to be niggardly in the affection which he shows her over the years. At one point she confronts him about being extravagant with his money when it comes to his models and courtesans, while at the same time being stingy about even buying her a coat. Annette reminds him that he has money now that he is a successful artist and insists on getting some attention. Giacometti goes into a rage and reminds her that he does have money and begins casually flinging stacks of bills at her for her new coat. The effect is counterproductive and his wife is still displeased with his keeping courtesans around his studio and in his home.

The progress on the portrait continues very slowly as one week passes into a second week and a third week. Giacometti decides that he will now purchase a convertible for his model courtesan as she has become his primary muse for his artistry. He and Lord and the courtesan go out for a night on the town once her convertible arrives and when they get home, Giacometti finds that his studio has been ransacked. He appears to know what has happened and tells Lord that he must go to sort this out the next day.

In the morning, Giacometti takes Lord with him to visit a local bar where he is to meet up with the male manager who is minding the affairs of Giacometti's favorite courtesan. Giacometti gladly pays him the "fees" which he requires for the services of the courtesan, and he pays for her services in advance. Both Giacometti and the manager are pleased with the arrangement and apparently Giacometti and his premises are to be left intact without further disruption in the coming months ahead. Lord is becoming concerned for the long delays with the portrait and tries to recruit Giacometti's brother to assist him in getting his brother to work a little faster, though his brother completely refuses to do anything like this knowing his brother's prickly temperament. As the portrait painting enter its final stages, Lord eventually departs for his office abroad and reflects on what to him was a first hand witnessed account of the artistic process of Giacometti's genius of artistry at work.

Cast
Geoffrey Rush as Alberto Giacometti
Armie Hammer as James Lord
Clémence Poésy as Caroline
Tony Shalhoub as Diego Giacometti
James Faulkner as Pierre Matisse
Sylvie Testud as Annette Giacometti

Production
On 2 February 2015 Geoffrey Rush joined the cast of the film. On 13 May 2015 Armie Hammer joined the cast of the film. On 12 February 2016 Tony Shalhoub, Clémence Poésy and Sylvie Testud joined the cast of the film. Principal photography began on 15 February 2016.

Release
The film had its world premiere at the Berlin International Film Festival on February 11, 2017. Shortly after, Vertigo Releasing and Sony Pictures Classics acquired U.K. and U.S. distribution rights to the film, respectively. It was released in the United Kingdom on August 18, 2017.

The film had its American premiere at South by Southwest on March 9, 2018, and went into wider release on March 23, 2018.

Reception
Final Portrait received positive reviews from film critics. It holds a 73% approval rating on review aggregator website Rotten Tomatoes, based on 131 reviews, and an average rating of 6.6/10. The website's critical consensus reads, ""Final Portrait finds writer-director Stanley Tucci patiently telling a quietly absorbing story, brought to life by a talented ensemble led by Geoffrey Rush and Armie Hammer. On Metacritic, the film holds a rating of 70 out of 100, based on 32 critics, indicating "generally favorable reviews".

References

External links

 
 

2017 films
2017 biographical drama films
British biographical drama films
American biographical drama films
Sony Pictures Classics films
Vertigo Films films
Films directed by Stanley Tucci
Biographical films about painters
Biographical films about sculptors
Films about writers
Cultural depictions of sculptors
Cultural depictions of Swiss men
2017 drama films
2010s English-language films
2010s American films
2010s British films